The 1988 World Rowing Championships were World Rowing Championships that were held on 6 August 1988 at Milan in Italy. Since 1988 was an Olympic year for rowing, the World Championships did not include Olympic events scheduled for the 1988 Summer Olympics, but instead the lightweight events were held in conjunction with the World Junior Championships, which ran from 3 to 7 August.

Medal summary

Medalists at the 1988 World Rowing Championships were:

Men's lightweight events

Women's lightweight events

References

World Rowing Championships
World Rowing Championships
Rowing competitions in Italy
Rowing
Rowing
Rowing 1988
Rowing
1980s in Milan